Petrus Ngebo, previously known as Petrus Mahlatsi, (born 1 April 1984) is a South African former soccer player who played as a forward.

References

External links
 

1984 births
South African soccer players
Living people
Association football forwards
Bloemfontein Celtic F.C. players
SuperSport United F.C. players
Soccer players from the Free State (province)
South Africa international soccer players
Free State Stars F.C. players
Chippa United F.C. players